Heslop is a surname. Notable people with the surname include:
Aidan Heslop (born 2002), British diver
Barbara Heslop (1925–2013), New Zealand immunologist
Desiree Heslop (born 1961), British singer
Gavin Heslop (born 1997), American football player
George Heslop (1940–2006), English footballer
Gerald Heslop (1879–1913), English cricketer
Harold Heslop (1898-1983), English writer
J Malan Heslop (1923–2011), American photographer who documented evidence of Nazi war crimes
John William Heslop-Harrison FRSE (1881–1967), British biologist, father of...
Jack Heslop-Harrison FRSE (1920–1998), British botanist and his brother Dr George Heslop-Harrison FRSE (1911-1964) entomologist
Richard Heslop (born 1961), British television and film director
Richard Harry Heslop (1907–1973), British Special Operations Executive agent
Richard Oliver Heslop (1842–1916), British Historian, songwriter and lexicographer of North East England

Simon Heslop (born 1987), English footballer

See also
Hyslop
Hislop